The South Branch Blackwater River is an  river in Aroostook County, Maine. From its source in Maine Township 9, Range 3, WELS, the stream runs northwest to its confluence with the North Branch to form the Blackwater River in Squa Pan Township (T. 10, R. 4, WELS). Via the Blackwater River, St. Croix Stream, and the Aroostook River, the South Branch is part of the Saint John River watershed.

See also
List of rivers of Maine

References

Maine Streamflow Data from the USGS
Maine Watershed Data From Environmental Protection Agency

Tributaries of the Saint John River (Bay of Fundy)
Rivers of Aroostook County, Maine